Ellen Hartman (born Helena Elisabeth Florentina Hedlund, 31 July 1860 in Stockholm – 4 January 1945 in Stockholm), was a Swedish actress. She was one of the greatest stars of the stage in Stockholm during the 1880s and 1890s. She was awarded the Litteris et Artibus.

Biography 

Ellen Hartman made her debut on the stage in 1877.  She was a student of the Royal Dramatic Training Academy in Stockholm 1878–1880.  Among her teachers were Bertha Tammelin.  She was employed at the Royal Dramatic Theatre in 1880–1890, from 1886 as a premier actress.  

She made a scandal when she eloped from her contract to Paris with her fiancé Gustaf Reinhold von Rosen.   After this, she was active in Paris, and took part in the tour of Coquelin to Russia and Scandinavia.  In 1893–94, she was employed at Théâtre Vaudeville in Paris. 

She was active at the Royal Dramatic Theatre again in 1894–98. 

In 1924, she participated in the film The Saga of Gosta Berling, starring Greta Garbo and Lars Hanson, in which Hartman portrayed Märta Dohna.

She is sometimes credited as Ellen Hartman-Cederström.

Personal life and death
She was married to the actor Victor Laurentius Hartman in 1881, and to Baron Carl Gustaf Bror Cederström in 1898. She died on January 5, 1945.

Filmography 
 The Saga of Gosta Berling (1924)

References 
 

Lindenbaum, Arne: Okrönta härskarinnor på Stockholms slott, C.E. Fritzes Bokförlags Aktiebolag Zetterlund & Thelanders Boktryckeri AB, Stockholm 1952 (250 s).
Anbytarforum - Aktrisen Ellen Hartman-Cederström född 1860
I:178 Svenskt Biografiskt handlexikon - 9. Cederström, Helena Elisabeth Florentina (Ellen Hartman) (del 1 - Projekt Runeberg)
I:179 Svenskt Biografiskt handlexikon - 9. Cederström, Helena Elisabeth Florentina (Ellen Hartman) (del 2 - Projekt Runeberg)

External links

Further reading 
  

1860 births
1945 deaths
Swedish stage actresses
19th-century Swedish actresses
Litteris et Artibus recipients